Belebathan is a census town in the Raniganj CD block in the Asansol Sadar subdivision of the Paschim Bardhaman district in the state of West Bengal, India.

Geography

Location

Jemari (J.K. Nagar Township), Belebathan, Murgathaul, Amkula, Egara, Sahebganj, Raghunathchak and Ballavpur form a cluster of census towns on the western and southern side of Raniganj. Banshra and Baktarnagar are adjacent to Raniganj on the eastern side.

Urbanisation
According to the 2011 census, 83.33% of the population of Asansol Sadar subdivision was urban and 16.67% was rural. In 2015, the municipal areas of Kulti, Raniganj and Jamuria were included within the jurisdiction of Asansol Municipal Corporation. Asansol Sadar subdivision has 26 (+1 partly) Census Towns.(partly presented in the map alongside; all places marked on the map are linked in the full-screen map).

Demographics
According to the 2011 Census of India Belebathan had a total population of 4,459 of which 2,302 (52%) were males and 2,157 (48%) were females. Population in age mix 0–6 years was 594. The total number of literate persons in Belebathan was 2,792 (72.24% of the population over 6 years).

*For language details see Raniganj (community development block)#Language and religion

 India census, Belebathan had a population of 4,292. Males constitute 53% of the population and females 47%. Belebathan has an average literacy rate of 54%, lower than the national average of 59.5%; 66% of the literates are males and 34% are females. 15% of the population is under 6 years of age.

Infrastructure

According to the District Census Handbook 2011, Bardhaman, Belebathan covered an area of 2.95 km2. Among the civic amenities, it had 8 km roads with open drains, the protected water-supply involved overhead tank, tube well, borewell, uncovered wells. It had 335 domestic electric connections. Among the medical facilities, it had 1 dispensary/ health centre, 5 medicine shops. Among the educational facilities it had were 2 primary schools, 1 middle school, the nearest senior secondary school at Jemari (J.K. Nagar Township) 1 km away. It had 2 non-formal education centres (Sarva Shiksha Abhiyan). An important commodity it produced was coal.

Education
Belebathan has two primary schools.

References

Cities and towns in Paschim Bardhaman district